

Events

Pre-1600
 800 – A council is convened in the Vatican, at which Charlemagne is to judge the accusations against Pope Leo III.
1420 – Henry V of England enters Paris alongside his father-in-law King Charles VI of France.
1577 – Courtiers Christopher Hatton and Thomas Heneage are knighted by Queen Elizabeth I of England.

1601–1900
1640 – End of the Iberian Union: Portugal acclaims as King João IV of Portugal, ending 59 years of personal union of the crowns of Portugal and Spain and the end of the rule of the Philippine Dynasty.
1662 – Diarist John Evelyn records skating on the frozen lake in St James's Park, London, watched by Charles II and Queen Catherine.
1768 – The former slave ship Fredensborg sinks off Tromøya in Norway.
1821 – José Núñez de Cáceres wins the independence of the Dominican Republic from Spain and names the new territory the Republic of Spanish Haiti.
1822 – Pedro I is crowned Emperor of Brazil.
1824 – United States presidential election: Since no candidate received a majority of the total electoral college votes in the election, the United States House of Representatives is given the task of deciding the winner in accordance with the Twelfth Amendment to the United States Constitution.
1828 – Argentine general Juan Lavalle makes a coup against governor Manuel Dorrego, beginning the Decembrist revolution.
1834 – Slavery is abolished in the Cape Colony in accordance with the Slavery Abolition Act 1833.
1862 – In his State of the Union Address President Abraham Lincoln reaffirms the necessity of ending slavery as ordered ten weeks earlier in the Emancipation Proclamation.
1865 – Shaw University, the first historically black university in the southern United States, is founded in Raleigh, North Carolina.
1878 – President Rutherford B. Hayes gets the first telephone installed in the White House. 
1900 – Nicaragua sells canal rights to U.S. for $5 million. The canal agreement fails in March 1901. Great Britain rejects amended treaty

1901–present
1913 – The Buenos Aires Metro, the first underground railway system in the Southern Hemisphere and in Latin America, begins operation.
  1913   – Crete, having obtained self rule from Turkey after the First Balkan War, is annexed by Greece.
1918 – Transylvania unites with Romania, following the incorporation of Bessarabia (March 27) and Bukovina (November 28) and thus concluding the Great Union.
  1918   – Iceland becomes a sovereign state, yet remains a part of the Danish kingdom.
  1918   – The Kingdom of Serbs, Croats and Slovenes (later known as the Kingdom of Yugoslavia) is proclaimed.
1919 – Lady Astor becomes the first female Member of Parliament (MP) to take her seat in the House of Commons of the United Kingdom. (She had been elected to that position on November 28.)
1924 – The National Hockey League's first United States-based franchise, the Boston Bruins, plays their first game in league play at home, at the still-extant Boston Arena indoor hockey facility.
1934 – Sergei Kirov is assassinated, paving way for the repressive Great Purge, and Vinnytsia massacre by General Secretary of the Communist Party of the Soviet Union, Joseph Stalin.
1939 – World War II: A day after the beginning of the Winter War in Finland, the Cajander III Cabinet resigns and is replaced by the Ryti I Cabinet, while the Finnish Parliament move from Helsinki to Kauhajoki to escape the Soviet airstrikes.
1941 – World War II: Emperor Hirohito of Japan gives his tacit approval to the decision of the imperial council to initiate war against the United States.
  1941   – World War II: Fiorello La Guardia, Mayor of New York City and Director of the Office of Civilian Defense, signs Administrative Order 9, creating the Civil Air Patrol.
1952 – The New York Daily News reports the news of Christine Jorgensen, the first notable case of sex reassignment surgery.
1955 – American Civil Rights Movement: In Montgomery, Alabama, seamstress Rosa Parks refuses to give up her bus seat to a white man and is arrested for violating the city's racial segregation laws, an incident which leads to that city's bus boycott.
1958 – The Central African Republic attains self-rule within the French Union.
  1958   – The Our Lady of the Angels School fire in Chicago kills 92 children and three nuns.
1959 – Cold War: Opening date for signature of the Antarctic Treaty, which sets aside Antarctica as a scientific preserve and bans military activity on the continent.
1960 – Patrice Lumumba is arrested by Mobutu Sese Seko's men on the banks of the Sankuru River, for inciting the army to rebellion.
1963 – Nagaland, became the 16th state of India.
1964 – Vietnam War: U.S. President Lyndon B. Johnson and his top-ranking advisers meet to discuss plans to bomb North Vietnam.
1969 – Vietnam War: The first draft lottery in the United States is held since World War II.
1971 – Cambodian Civil War: Khmer Rouge rebels intensify assaults on Cambodian government positions, forcing their retreat from Kompong Thmar and nearby Ba Ray.
  1971   – Purge of Croatian Spring leaders starts in Yugoslavia at the meeting of the  League of Communists at the Karađorđevo estate
1973 – Papua New Guinea gains self-government from Australia.
1974 – TWA Flight 514, a Boeing 727, crashes northwest of Dulles International Airport, killing all 92 people on board.
  1974   – Northwest Airlines Flight 6231, another Boeing 727, crashes northwest of John F. Kennedy International Airport.
1981 – Inex-Adria Aviopromet Flight 1308, a McDonnell Douglas MD-80, crashes in Corsica, killing all 180 people on board.
1984 – NASA conducts the Controlled Impact Demonstration, wherein an airliner is deliberately crashed in order to test technologies and gather data to help improve survivability of crashes.
1988 – World AIDS Day is proclaimed worldwide by the UN member states.
  1988   – Benazir Bhutto, is named as the Prime Minister of Pakistan, becoming the first female leader to lead a muslim nation. 
1989 – Philippine coup attempt: The right-wing military rebel Reform the Armed Forces Movement attempts to oust Philippine President Corazon Aquino in a failed bloody coup d'état.
  1989   – Cold War: East Germany's parliament abolishes the constitutional provision granting the Communist Party the leading role in the state.
1990 – Channel Tunnel sections started from the United Kingdom and France meet beneath the seabed.
1991 – Cold War: Ukrainian voters overwhelmingly approve a referendum for independence from the Soviet Union.
1997 – In the Indian state of Bihar, Ranvir Sena attacks the CPI (ML) Party Unity stronghold Lakshmanpur-Bathe, killing 63 lower caste people.
  1997   – Heath High School shooting in West Paducah, Kentucky.
2000 – Vicente Fox Quesada is inaugurated as the president of Mexico, marking the first peaceful transfer of executive federal power to an opposing political party following a free and democratic election in Mexico's history.
2018 – The Oulu Police informed the public about the first offence of the much larger child sexual exploitation in Oulu, Finland.
2019 – Arsenal Women 11–1 Bristol City Women breaks the record for most goals scored in a FA Women's Super League match, with Vivianne Miedema involved in ten of the eleven Arsenal goals.
2020 – The Arecibo Telescope collapsed.

Births

Pre-1600
 624 – Hasan ibn Ali, the second Shia Imam (d. 670)
1081 – Louis VI, French king (d. 1137)
1083 – Anna Komnene, Byzantine physician and scholar (d. 1153) 
1415 – Jan Długosz, Polish historian (d. 1480)
1438 – Peter II, Duke of Bourbon, son of Charles I (d. 1503)
1443 – Magdalena of France, French princess (d. 1495)
1521 – Takeda Shingen, Japanese daimyō (d. 1573)
1525 – Tadeáš Hájek, Czech physician and astronomer (d. 1600)
1530 – Bernardino Realino, Italian Jesuit (d. 1616)
1561 – Sophie Hedwig of Brunswick-Wolfenbüttel, Duchess consort of Pomerania-Wolgast (d. 1631)
1580 – Nicolas-Claude Fabri de Peiresc, French astronomer and historian (d. 1637)

1601–1900
1690 – Philip Yorke, 1st Earl of Hardwicke, English lawyer and politician, Lord Chancellor of the United Kingdom (d. 1764)
1709 – Franz Xaver Richter, Czech composer, violinist, and conductor (d. 1789)
1716 – Étienne Maurice Falconet, French sculptor (d. 1791)
1743 – Martin Heinrich Klaproth, German chemist and academic (d. 1817)
1761 – Marie Tussaud, French-English sculptor, founded Madame Tussauds Wax Museum (d. 1850)
1792 – Nikolai Lobachevsky, Russian mathematician and geometer (d. 1856)
1800 – Mihály Vörösmarty, Hungarian poet (d. 1855)
1805 – 9th Dalai Lama, Tibetan Buddhist spiritual leader (d. 1815)
1844 – Alexandra of Denmark (d. 1925)
1846 – Ledi Sayadaw, Burmese monk and philosopher (d. 1923)
1847 – Julia A. Moore, American poet (d. 1920)
1855 – John Evans, English-Australian politician, 21st Premier of Tasmania (d. 1943)
1869 – Eligiusz Niewiadomski, Polish painter and critic (d. 1923)
1871 – Archie MacLaren, English cricketer (d. 1944)
1883 – Henry Cadbury, American historian, scholar, and academic (d. 1974)
1884 – Karl Schmidt-Rottluff, German painter and etcher (d. 1976)
1886 – Rex Stout, American detective novelist (d. 1975)
  1886   – Zhu De, Chinese general and politician, 1st Vice Chairman of the People's Republic of China (d. 1976)
1894 – Afrânio Pompílio Gastos do Amaral, Brazilian herpetologist (d. 1982)
1895 – Henry Williamson, English farmer, soldier, and author (d. 1977)
1896 – Georgy Zhukov, Russian general and politician, 2nd Minister of Defence for the Soviet Union (d. 1974)
1898 – Stuart Garson, Canadian lawyer and politician, 12th Premier of Manitoba (d. 1977)
  1898   – Cyril Ritchard, Australian-American actor and singer (d. 1977)
1900 – Karna Maria Birmingham, Australian artist, illustrator and print maker (d. 1987)

1901–present
1901 – Ilona Fehér, Hungarian-Israeli violinist and educator (d. 1988)
1903 – Nikolai Voznesensky, Soviet economic planner, member of the Politburo of the Central Committee of the Communist Party of the Soviet Union (d. 1950)
1905 – Alex Wilson, Canadian sprinter and coach (d. 1994)
1910 – Alicia Markova, English ballerina and choreographer (d. 2004)
1911 – Calvin Griffith, Canadian-American businessman (d. 1999)
1912 – Billy Raimondi, American baseball player (d. 2010)
  1912   – Minoru Yamasaki, American architect, designed the World Trade Center (d. 1986)
1913 – Mary Martin, American actress and singer (d. 1990)
1916 – Wan Li, Chinese educator and politician, 4th Vice Premier of the People's Republic of China (d. 2015)
1917 – Thomas Hayward, American tenor and actor (d. 1995)
1920 – Peter Baptist Tadamaro Ishigami, Japanese priest, 1st Bishop of Naha (d. 2014)
1921 – Vernon McGarity, American sergeant, Medal of Honor recipient (d. 2013)
1922 – Vsevolod Bobrov, Russian ice hockey player, footballer, and manager (d. 1979)
1923 – Dick Shawn, American actor (d. 1987)
  1923   – Stansfield Turner, American admiral and academic, 12th Director of Central Intelligence (d. 2018)
1924 – Masao Horiba, Japanese businessman, founded Horiba (d. 2015)
1925 – Martin Rodbell, American biochemist and endocrinologist, Nobel Prize laureate (d. 1998)
1926 – Mother Antonia, American-Mexican nun and activist (d. 2013)
  1926   – Allyn Ann McLerie, Canadian-American actress, singer, and dancer (d. 2018)
  1926   – Keith Michell, Australian actor (d. 2015)
  1926   – Robert Symonds, American actor (d. 2007)
  1926   – Colin Tennant, 3rd Baron Glenconner, Scottish businessman (d. 2010)
1927 – Micheline Bernardini, French dancer and model
1928 – Emily McLaughlin, American actress (d. 1991)
  1928   – Malachi Throne, American actor (d. 2013)
1929 – David Doyle, American actor (d. 1997)
1930 – Marie Bashir, Australian psychiatrist, academic, and politician, 37th Governor of New South Wales
  1930   – Joachim Hoffmann, German historian and author (d. 2002)
1931 – Jimmy Lyons, American saxophonist (d. 1986)
  1931   – Jim Nesbitt, American singer-songwriter and guitarist (d. 2007)
  1931   – George Maxwell Richards, Trinidadian politician, 4th President of Trinidad and Tobago (d. 2018)
1933 – Lou Rawls, American singer-songwriter, producer, and actor (d. 2006)
  1933   – Violette Verdy, French ballerina (d. 2016)
1934 – Billy Paul, American soul singer (d. 2016)
  1935   – Sola Sierra, Chilean human rights activist (d. 1999)
1936 – Igor Rodionov, Russian general and politician, 3rd Russian Minister of Defence (d. 2014)
1937 – Muriel Costa-Greenspon, American soprano and actress (d. 2005)
  1937   – Gordon Crosse, English composer and academic (d. 2021)
  1937   – Vaira Vīķe-Freiberga, Latvian psychologist and politician, President of Latvia
1938 – Sandy Nelson, American rock and roll drummer
1939 – Lee Trevino, American golfer and sportscaster
1940 – Mike Denness, Scottish cricketer and referee (d. 2013)
  1940   – Richard Pryor, American comedian, actor, producer, and screenwriter (d. 2005)
  1940   – Tasso Wild, German footballer
  1940   – Jerry Lawson, American electronic engineer and inventor (d. 2011)
1942 – Mohamed Kamel Amr, Egyptian politician, Egyptian Minister of Foreign Affairs
  1942   – John Crowley, American author and academic
  1942   – Ross Edwards, Australian cricketer
1943 – Kenny Moore, American runner and journalist
1944 – Eric Bloom, American singer-songwriter and guitarist 
  1944   – John Densmore, American drummer and songwriter 
  1944   – Michael Hagee, American general
  1944   – Tahar Ben Jelloun, Moroccan author and poet
1945 – Bette Midler, American singer-songwriter, actress and producer
1946 – Jonathan Katz, American comedian and actor
  1946   – Kemal Kurspahić, Bosnian journalist and author
  1946   – Gilbert O'Sullivan, Irish singer-songwriter and pianist
1947 – Alain Bashung, French singer-songwriter and actor (d. 2009)
  1947   – Bob Fulton, English-Australian rugby league player, coach, and sportscaster (d. 2021)
1948 – George Foster, American baseball player and radio host
  1948   – Sarfraz Nawaz, Pakistani cricketer and politician
  1948   – John Roskelley, American mountaineer and author
  1948   – Neil Warnock, English footballer and manager
  1948   – N. T. Wright, English bishop and scholar
  1948   – Patrick Ibrahim Yakowa, Nigerian civil servant and politician, Governor of Kaduna State (d. 2012)
1949 – Jan Brett, American author and illustrator
  1949   – Pablo Escobar, Colombian drug lord and narcoterrorist (d. 1993)
  1949   – Sebastián Piñera, Chilean businessman and politician, 35th President of Chile
1950 – Manju Bansal, Indian biologist and academic
  1950   – Ross Hannaford, Australian singer-songwriter and guitarist (d. 2016)
  1950   – Gary Panter, American illustrator and painter
  1950   – Filippos Petsalnikos, Greek lawyer and politician, Greek Minister of Justice (d. 2020)
  1950   – Richard Keith, American actor and drummer 
1951 – Aleksandr Panayotov Aleksandrov, Bulgarian cosmonaut
  1951   – Obba Babatundé, American actor, director, and producer
  1951   – Doug Mulray, Australian radio and television host
  1951   – Jaco Pastorius, American bass player, songwriter, and producer (d. 1987)
  1951   – Nozipho Schroeder, South African lawn bowler
  1951   – Treat Williams, American actor 
1952 – Stephen Poliakoff, English director, producer, and playwright
1954 – Alan Dedicoat, English journalist
  1954   – Judith Hackitt, English chemist and engineer
  1954   – François Van der Elst, Belgian footballer (d. 2017)
1955 – Veikko Aaltonen, Finnish actor, director, and screenwriter 
  1955   – Verónica Forqué, Spanish actress
  1955   – Pat Spillane, Irish footballer and sportscaster
  1955   – Karen Tumulty, American journalist
  1955   – Udit Narayan, Indian playback singer
1956 – Julee Cruise, American singer-songwriter, musician, and actress (d. 2022)
1957 – Chris Poland, American guitarist and songwriter 
  1957   – Vesta Williams, American singer-songwriter and actress (d. 2011)
1958 – Javier Aguirre, Mexican footballer and manager
  1958   – Candace Bushnell, American journalist and author
  1958   – Alberto Cova, Italian runner
  1958   – Gary Peters, American politician
1959 – Billy Childish, English singer-songwriter, guitarist, and painter 
  1959   – Wally Lewis, Australian rugby league player, coach, and sportscaster
1960 – Carol Alt, American model and actress
  1960   – Shirin M. Rai, Indian-English political scientist and academic
  1960   – Jane Turner, Australian actress and producer
1961 – Safra Catz, Israeli-American businesswoman
  1961   – Raymond E. Goldstein, American biophysicist and academic
  1961   – Jeremy Northam, English actor
1962 – Sylvie Daigle, Canadian speed skater
  1962   – Pamela McGee, American basketball player and coach
1963 – Marco Greco, Brazilian race car driver
  1963   – Nathalie Lambert, Canadian speed skater
  1963   – Arjuna Ranatunga, Sri Lankan cricketer and politician
1964 – Salvatore Schillaci, Italian footballer
  1964   – Jo Walton, Welsh-Canadian author and poet
1965 – Henry Honiball, South African rugby player
  1965   – Magnifico, Slovenian singer
1966 – Andrew Adamson, New Zealand director, producer, and screenwriter
  1966   – Katherine LaNasa, American actress, ballet dancer, and choreographer
  1966   – Larry Walker, Canadian baseball player and coach
1967 – Nestor Carbonell, American actor
  1967   – Reggie Sanders, American baseball player
1968 – Justin Chadwick, English actor and director
  1968   – Sarah Fitzgerald, Australian squash player
  1968   – Anders Holmertz, Swedish swimmer
1969 – Richard Carrier, American author and blogger
1970 – Jonathan Coulton, American singer-songwriter and guitarist
  1970   – Kirk Rueter, American baseball player
  1970   – Sarah Silverman, American comedian, actress, and singer 
  1970   – Tisha Waller, American high jumper and educator
1971 – Christian Pescatori, Italian race car driver
  1971   – Mika Pohjola, Finnish-American pianist and composer
  1971   – John Schlimm, American author and educator
1972 – Stanton Barrett, American race car driver and stuntman
  1972   – Bart Millard, American singer-songwriter 
1973 – Steve Gibb, English singer-songwriter and guitarist 
1974 – Costinha, Portuguese footballer and manager
1975 – Matt Fraction, American author
  1975   – Isaiah "Ikey" Owens, American keyboard player and producer (d. 2014)
  1975   – Farah Shah, Pakistani actress and host
  1975   – Thomas Schie, Norwegian racing driver and sportscaster
  1975   – Sophia Skou, Danish swimmer
1976 – Tomasz Adamek, Polish boxer
  1976   – Laura Ling, American journalist and author
  1976   – Evangelos Sklavos, Greek basketball player
1977 – Brad Delson, American guitarist and producer
  1977   – Sophie Guillemin, French actress
  1977   – Lee McKenzie, Scottish journalist
1978 – Mat Kearney, American musician
1979 – Ryan Malone, American ice hockey player
  1979   – Stephanie Brown Trafton, American discus thrower
1980 – Iftikhar Anjum, Pakistani cricketer
  1980   – Mohammad Kaif, Indian cricketer and politician
  1980   – Mubarak Hassan Shami, Kenyan-Qatari runner
  1980   – Gianna Terzi, Greek singer
1981 – Park Hyo-shin, South Korean singer-songwriter and actor
  1981   – Luke McPharlin, Australian footballer
  1981   – I Made Wirawan, Indonesian footballer
1982 – Riz Ahmed, English actor and rapper
  1982   – Christos Kalantzis, Greek footballer
  1982   – Christos Melissis, Greek footballer
1985 – Janelle Monáe, American singer-songwriter and producer
  1985   – Emiliano Viviano, Italian footballer
1986 – DeSean Jackson, American football player
1987 – Simon Dawkins, English footballer
  1987   – Tabarie Henry, Virgin Islander sprinter
  1987   – Vance Joy, Australian singer-songwriter
  1987   – Brett Williams, English footballer
1988 – Zoë Kravitz, American actress, singer, and model
  1988   – Dan Mavraides, Greek-American basketball player
  1988   – Tyler Joseph, American musician and singer
1989 – Sotelúm, Mexican trumpet player, composer, and producer
1990 – Tomáš Tatar, Slovak ice hockey player
1991 – Hilda Melander, Swedish tennis player
  1991   – Sun Yang, Chinese swimmer
1992 – Masahudu Alhassan, Ghanaian footballer
  1992   – Javier Báez, Puerto Rican baseball player
  1992   – Linos Chrysikopoulos, Greek basketball player
  1992   – Marco van Ginkel, Dutch footballer
1993 – Reena Pärnat, Estonian archer
  1993   – Beau Webster, Australian cricketer
1994 – Seedy Njie, English footballer
1995 – Agnė Čepelytė, Lithuanian tennis player
  1995   – Jenna Fife, Scottish footballer
  1995   – James Wilson, English footballer
1997 – Sada Williams, Barbadian sprinter
1999 – Nico Schlotterbeck, German footballer
2001 – Carole Monnet, French tennis player

Deaths

Pre-1600
 217 – Yehudah HaNasi, 'Nasi', Rabbi and editor of the Mishnah (b. 135)
 660 – Eligius, Frankish bishop and saint (b. 588)
 948 – Gao Conghui, Chinese governor and prince (b. 891)
 969 – Fujiwara no Morotada, Japanese statesman (b. 920)
1018 – Thietmar of Merseburg, German bishop (b. 975)
1135 – Henry I, king of England (b. 1068)
1241 – Isabella of England, Holy Roman Empress (b. 1214)
1255 – Muhammad III of Alamut, Nizari Ismaili Imam
1335 – Abu Sa'id Bahadur Khan, Mongol ruler of the Ilkhanate (b. 1305)
1374 – Magnus Ericson, king of Sweden (b. 1316)
1433 – Go-Komatsu, emperor of Japan (b. 1377)
1455 – Lorenzo Ghiberti, Italian goldsmith and sculptor (b. 1378)
1521 – Leo X, pope of the Catholic Church (b. 1475)
1530 – Margaret of Austria, duchess of Savoy (b. 1480)
1580 – Giovanni Morone, Italian cardinal (b. 1509)
1581 – Alexander Briant, English Roman Catholic priest, martyr and saint (b. 1556)
  1581   – Edmund Campion, English Roman Catholic priest, martyr, and saint (b. 1540)
  1581   – Ralph Sherwin, English Roman Catholic priest, martyr, and saint (b. 1550)

1601–1900
1633 – Isabella Clara Eugenia, infanta of Spain (b. 1566)
1640 – Miguel de Vasconcelos, Portuguese politician, Prime Minister of Portugal (b. 1590)
1660 – Pierre d'Hozier, French genealogist and historian (b. 1592)
1729 – Giacomo F. Maraldi, French-Italian astronomer and mathematician (b. 1665)
1750 – Johann Gabriel Doppelmayr, German mathematician, astronomer, and cartographer (b. 1671)
1755 – Maurice Greene, English organist and composer (b. 1696)
1767 – Henry Erskine, 10th Earl of Buchan, Scottish politician (b. 1710)
1825 – Alexander I, emperor and autocrat of Russia (b. 1777)
1865 – Abraham Emanuel Fröhlich, Swiss pastor, poet, and educator (b. 1796)
1866 – George Everest, Welsh geographer and surveyor (b. 1790)
1867 – Charles Gray Round, English lawyer and politician (b. 1797)
1884 – William Swainson, English-New Zealand lawyer and politician, Attorney-General of the Crown Colony of New Zealand (b. 1809)

1901–present
1913 – Juhan Liiv, Estonian poet and author (b. 1864)
1914 – Alfred Thayer Mahan, American captain and historian (b. 1840)
1916 – Charles de Foucauld, French priest and martyr (b. 1858)
1923 – Virginie Loveling, Belgian author and poet (b. 1836)
1928 – José Eustasio Rivera, Colombian-American lawyer and poet (b. 1888)
1933 – Pekka Halonen, Finnish painter (b. 1865)
1934 – Sergey Kirov, Russian engineer and politician (b. 1886)
1935 – Bernhard Schmidt, Estonian-German optician, invented the Schmidt camera (b. 1879)
1942 – Leon Wachholz, Polish scientist and medical examiner (b. 1867)
1943 – Damrong Rajanubhab, Thai historian and educator (b. 1862)
1947 – Aleister Crowley, English magician, poet, and mountaineer (b. 1875)
  1947   – G. H. Hardy, English mathematician and theorist (b. 1877)
1950 – Ernest John Moeran, English pianist and composer (b. 1894)
1954 – Fred Rose, American pianist, composer, and publisher (b. 1898)
1958 – Elizabeth Peratrovich, Alaskan-American civil rights activist (b. 1911)
1964 – J. B. S. Haldane, English-Indian geneticist and biologist (b. 1892)
  1964   – Charilaos Vasilakos, Greek runner (b. 1877)
1968 – Nicolae Bretan, Romanian opera singer, composer, and conductor (b. 1887)
  1968   – Darío Moreno, Turkish singer-songwriter, guitarist, and actor (b. 1921)
1973 – David Ben-Gurion, Israeli politician, 1st Prime Minister of Israel (b. 1886)
1975 – Nellie Fox, American baseball player and coach (b. 1927)
  1975   – Ernesto Maserati, Italian race car driver and engineer (b. 1898)
  1975   – Anna Roosevelt Halsted, American journalist (b. 1906)
1981 – Russ Manning, American author and illustrator (b. 1929)
1984 – Roelof Frankot, Dutch painter and photographer (b. 1911)
1986 – Frank McCarthy, American general and film producer (b. 1912)
1987 – James Baldwin, American novelist, poet, and critic (b. 1924)
  1987   – Punch Imlach, Canadian ice hockey player, coach, and manager (b. 1918)
1988 – J. Vernon McGee, American pastor and theologian (b. 1904)
1989 – Alvin Ailey, American dancer and choreographer (b. 1931)
1990 – Carla Lehmann, Canadian-English actress (b. 1917)
1991 – Pat O'Callaghan, Irish athlete (b. 1906)
  1991   – George Stigler, American economist and academic, Nobel Prize laureate (b. 1911)
1993 – Ray Gillen, American singer-songwriter (b. 1959)
1995 – Hopper Levett, English cricketer (b. 1908)
  1995   – Colin Tapley, New Zealand-English actor (b. 1907)
  1995   – Maxwell R. Thurman, American general (b. 1931)
1996 – Peter Bronfman, Canadian businessman (b. 1928)
1997 – Michel Bélanger, Canadian banker and businessman (b. 1929)
  1997   – Stéphane Grappelli, French violinist (b. 1908)
  1997   – Endicott Peabody, American lieutenant, lawyer, and politician, 62nd Governor of Massachusetts (b. 1920)
2001 – Ellis R. Dungan, American director and producer (b. 1909)
2002 – Edward L. Beach Jr., American captain and author (b. 1918)
  2002   – Dave McNally, American baseball player (b. 1942)
2003 – Clark Kerr, American economist and academic (b. 1911)
  2003   – Eugenio Monti, Italian bobsledder (b. 1928)
2004 – Prince Bernhard of Lippe-Biesterfeld (b. 1911)
  2004   – Bill Brown, Scottish-Canadian footballer (b. 1931)
2005 – Gust Avrakotos, American CIA officer  (b. 1938)
  2005   – Mary Hayley Bell, English actress and playwright (b. 1911)
  2005   – Freeman V. Horner, American soldier, Medal of Honor recipient (b. 1922)
2006 – Claude Jade, French actress (b. 1948)
  2006   – Bruce Trigger, Canadian archaeologist, anthropologist, and historian (b. 1937)
2007 – Ken McGregor, Australian tennis player and footballer (b. 1929)
  2007   – Anton Rodgers, British actor (b. 1933)
2008 – Paul Benedict, American actor (b. 1938)
  2008   – Joseph B. Wirthlin, American businessman and religious leader (b. 1917)
2010 – Adriaan Blaauw, Dutch astronomer and academic (b. 1914)
  2010   – Hillard Elkins, American actor and producer (b. 1929)
2011 – Christa Wolf, German author and critic (b. 1929)
2012 – Jovan Belcher, American football player (b. 1987)
  2012   – Arthur Chaskalson, South African lawyer and judge, 18th Chief Justice of South Africa (b. 1931)
  2012   – Rick Majerus, American basketball player and coach (b. 1948)
  2012   – Ed Price, American soldier, pilot, and politician (b. 1918)
2013 – Richard Coughlan, English drummer (b. 1947)
  2013   – Stirling Colgate, American physicist and academic (b. 1925)
  2013   – Edward Heffron, American soldier (b. 1923)
  2013   – Martin Sharp, Australian cartoonist and songwriter (b. 1942)
2014 – Mario Abramovich, Argentinian violinist and composer (b. 1926)
  2014   – Dimitrios Trichopoulos, Greek epidemiologist, oncologist, and academic (b. 1938)
  2014   – Rocky Wood, New Zealand-Australian author (b. 1959)
2015 – Rob Blokzijl, Dutch physicist and computer scientist (b. 1943)
  2015   – Joseph Engelberger, American physicist and engineer (b. 1925)
  2015   – John F. Kurtzke, American neurologist and academic (b. 1926)
  2015   – Jim Loscutoff, American basketball player (b. 1930)
  2015   – Trevor Obst, Australian footballer and coach (b. 1940)
2018 – Vivian Lynn, New Zealand artist (b. 1931)
  2018   – Ken Berry, American actor, dancer, and singer (b. 1933)
2019 – Paula Tilbrook, English actress (b. 1930)
2020 – Arnie Robinson, American athlete (b. 1948)
2022 – Gaylord Perry, American baseball player and coach (b. 1938)

Holidays and observances
Battle of the Sinop Day (Russia)
Christian feast day:
Alexander Briant
Ansanus
Blessed Bruna Pellesi
Castritian
Blessed Charles de Foucauld
Edmund Campion
Eligius
Evasius
Grwst
Nahum
Nicholas Ferrar (Episcopal Church)
Ralph Sherwin
Ursicinus of Brescia
December 1 (Eastern Orthodox liturgics)
Damrong Rajanubhab Day (Thailand)
Earliest day on which Farmer's Day can fall, while December 7 is the latest; celebrated on the first Friday in December. (Ghana)
Earliest day on which Good Neighborliness Day can fall, while December 7 is the latest; celebrated on the first Sunday in December. (Turkmenistan)
Earliest day on which Sindhi Cultural Day can fall, while December 7 is the latest; celebrated on the first Sunday in December. (Sindhi diaspora)
First President Day (Kazakhstan)
Freedom and Democracy Day (Chad)
Great Union Day, celebrates the Union of Transylvania with Romania in 1918. (Romania)
Military Abolition Day (Costa Rica)
National Day (Myanmar)
Republic Day (Central African Republic)
Restoration of Independence Day (Portugal)
Rosa Parks Day (Ohio and Oregon, United States)
Self-governance Day or Fullveldisdagurinn (Iceland)
Teachers' Day (Panama)
World AIDS Day, and its related observances: 
Day Without Art

References

External links

 BBC: On This Day
 
 Historical Events on December 1

Days of the year
December